The Jodrell Chair of Physiology is a chair at University College London, endowed (shortly before the Jodrell Professor of Zoology and Comparative Anatomy) by Thomas Jodrell Phillips Jodrell in 1873. The chairs succeeded the previous chair in Anatomy and Physiology.

This endowment was acknowledged in the final report of the Royal Commission on Scientific Instruction in 1875.

The first holder was John Burdon-Sanderson after the post received the Jodrell endowment.

 
Two Jodrell Professors, Archibald Hill and Andrew Huxley, have gone onto win the Nobel prize in physiology or medicine

Professors of Anatomy and Physiology 
1831-36 Jones Quain
1836-74 William Sharpey

Jodrell Professors of Physiology 
1874-82 Sir John Burdon Sanderson
1883-99 Edward Sharpey-Schafer
1899-23 Ernest Starling 
1923-25 Archibald Hill 
1926-49 Charles Lovatt Evans  
1949-60 Sir Lindor Brown 
1960-69 Sir Andrew Huxley  
1969-79 Douglas Wilkie
1979-95 Timothy Biscoe 
1995- David Attwell

References

Bibliography
 
 

Academics of University College London
Professorships at University College London